Naseeb Apna Apna is a Pakistani Urdu black-and-white film directed by Qamar Zaidi and produced by Waheed Murad. The cast included Waheed Murad, Shabnam, Zamurrud, Tamanna, Nirala and Saqi. The movie became a musical blockbuster and was one of the biggest hits of Shabnam's early career.

Cast
 Shabnam
 Waheed Murad
 Zamurrad
 Nirala
 Saqi
 Tamanna
 Mohammad Yousuf
 S.M. Saleem

Production
The film was produced by Waheed Murad, directed by Qamar Zaidi, and written by Iqbal Rizvi. M. Ayub did the camera work.

Release 
Naseeb Apna Apna was released on 3 April 1970 in Pakistani cinemas. The film completed 11 weeks on main cinemas and 32 weeks on other cinemas in Karachi and, thus, became a Silver Jubilee hit.

Music 
The music of the film was composed by Lal Mohammad Iqbal and the songs were written by Masroor Anwar. Playback singers are Ahmed Rushdi (he received the Best Playback Singer Nigar Award for this film), Mala, Runa Laila and Irene Perveen. A list of the songs for the film is as follows:

Aye abr-e-karam... by Ahmed Rushdi
Dil tum ko dey diya hai... by Ahmed Rushdi
Hum se na bigar o larki!... by Ahmed Rushdi
Ghum ko bhula kar... by Mala
Mili gul ko khushboo... by Runa Laila
Aaj nahi to kal is ghar mein... by Irene Perveen

Awards 
Ahmed Rushdi received Nigar Award in the Best Singer's category for the song Aye abr-e-karam for this film Naseeb Apna Apna.

References

External links 
 

Urdu-language Pakistani films
1970 films
Pakistani drama films
Films scored by Lal Mohammad Iqbal
1970s Urdu-language films
Nigar Award winners